Central Catholic High School              is a college prep school located in Portland, Oregon, United States. Central Catholic is affiliated with the Roman Catholic Church, and is the only archdiocesan high school in the Roman Catholic Archdiocese of Portland.

History

Central Catholic was founded 1934 by Archbishop Edward Howard as a diocesan high school for boys. In 1930, St. Mary's Cemetery was closed and the interments were relocated, mostly to Mount Calvary, and Central Catholic High School was built on the site of the old cemetery. Although the Great Depression made fund-raising difficult, the Knights of Columbus staged fund-raising affairs and a generous bequest made it possible to open the first unit of the school in 1939. It was dedicated on May 9, 1939, and opened with about 125 freshman and sophomore students. The first principal was Father Francis Schaefers.

Initially the school operated on a pay-as-you-go basis, meeting its expenses with its tuition, which was $50 a year. Overhead was low because many classes were taught by the diocesan priests, who did not take salaries, and by sisters from different congregations, who were paid $50 a month.

While teaching, many of the priests continued their education at universities such as the University of Notre Dame, the University of Oregon, Catholic University, Dominican College of San Rafael, and the University of Chicago.

Central Catholic became a co-ed high school in the 1980s. It accepted the first co-ed students as freshmen and sophomores for the 1980–81 school year. The first co-ed class graduated in 1983.

As part of the COVID-19 pandemic, the company received between $2 million and $5 million in federally backed small business loan from Customers Bank as part of the Paycheck Protection Program. The company stated it would allow them to retain 143 jobs.

Notable alumni
Blake Brandel, NFL player, Minnesota Vikings
Michael Doleac, basketball, Minnesota Timberwolves
Steven Evans, soccer, Portland Timbers
Joey Harrington, former NFL quarterback
Fred Quillan, 1974, football, San Francisco 49ers
Galen Rupp, 2012 Olympic 10,000m silver medalist, 2016 Olympic marathon bronze medalist
Brennan Scarlett, NFL linebacker, Houston Texans
George Van Hoomissen, former justice on the Oregon Supreme Court
Ryan Nall, NFL running back, Chicago Bears
 Brady Breeze, NFL Safety, Tennessee Titans

References

Roman Catholic Archdiocese of Portland in Oregon
Catholic secondary schools in Oregon
High schools in Portland, Oregon
Educational institutions established in 1939
Schools accredited by the Northwest Accreditation Commission
1939 establishments in Oregon
Buckman, Portland, Oregon